Rhamphomyia nigripennis is a species of dance flies, in the fly family Empididae. It is found in most of Europe, except France, Italy, Croatia, Bosnia, Greece, Albania, Romania, Ukraine and Belarus

References

External links
Fauna Europaea
Ecology of Commanster

Rhamphomyia
Asilomorph flies of Europe
Insects described in 1794